Ian Milne (born 26 November 1935) is a South African cricketer. He played in one first-class match for Border in 1957/58.

See also
 List of Border representative cricketers

References

External links
 

1935 births
Living people
South African cricketers
Border cricketers